Linare FC is a Lesotho football club based in Leribe in the Leribe District. It was established in 1931 and it has been in the Lesotho Premier Division from the early 1930s to date.

The team currently plays in Lesotho Premier League.

Stadium
Currently the team plays at the 1,000 capacity Hlotse Stadium.

Titles
 Lesotho Premier League: 3
1973, 1979, 1980

References

External links
Soccerway

Lesotho Premier League clubs